Suina, also known as Suiformes, is a suborder of omnivorous, non-ruminant hoofed mammals in the order Artiodactyla. A member of this clade is called a suine. It includes the family Suidae, termed suids or colloquially pigs or swine, as well as the family Tayassuidae, termed tayassuids or peccaries. Suines are largely native to Africa, South America, and Southeast Asia, with the exception of the wild boar, which is additionally native to Europe and Asia and introduced to North America and Australasia, including widespread use in farming of the domestic pig subspecies. Suines range in size from the 55 cm (22 in) long pygmy hog to the 210 cm (83 in) long giant forest hog, and are primarily found in forest, shrubland, and grassland biomes, though some can be found in deserts, wetlands, or coastal regions. Most species do not have population estimates, though approximately two billion domestic pigs are used in farming, while several species are considered endangered or critically endangered with populations as low as 100.

The 20 extant species of Suina are split between the Suidae family, containing 17 extant species belonging to six genera, and the Tayassuidae family, containing three species in three genera. All extant suids are members of the Suinae subfamily; extinct species have also been placed into Suinae as well as other subfamilies. Dozens of extinct Suina species have been discovered, though due to ongoing research and discoveries the exact number and categorization is not fixed.

Conventions

Conservation status codes listed follow the International Union for Conservation of Nature (IUCN) Red List of Threatened Species. Range maps are provided wherever possible; if a range map is not available, a description of the species's range is provided. Ranges are based on the IUCN Red List for that species unless otherwise noted. All extinct species or subspecies listed alongside extant species went extinct after 1500 CE, and are indicated by a dagger symbol "".

Classification
The suborder Suina consists of 20 extant species in nine genera, divided into dozens of extant subspecies. These are split between the Suidae family, containing 17 species belonging to 6 genera, and the Tayassuidae family, containing 3 species in 3 genera. This does not include hybrid species such as boar–pig hybrids or extinct prehistoric species.

 Family Suidae (Pigs)
 Genus Babyrousa: three species
 Genus Hylochoerus: one species
 Genus Phacochoerus: two species
 Genus Porcula: one species
 Genus Potamochoerus: two species
 Genus Sus: eight species
 Family Tayassuidae (Peccaries)
 Genus Catagonus: one species
 Genus Dicotyles: one species
 Genus Tayassu: one species

Suines
The following classification is based on the taxonomy described by Mammal Species of the World (2005), with augmentation by generally accepted proposals made since using molecular phylogenetic analysis. There are several additional proposals which are disputed, such as the creation of a fourth species of peccary, the giant peccary (Pecari maximus), which are not included here.

Suidae

Tayassuidae

References

Sources

 
 
 
 
 

 
suina
suina